Katz station is a railway station in Katz, British Columbia, Canada. It serves as a flag stop for Via Rail's The Canadian train. It is on the Canadian Pacific Railway Cascade subdivision, east of Ruby Creek.

The station is only served by eastbound trains towards Toronto. Westbound trains call at Hope railway station along the CN Railway tracks, on the other side of the Fraser River. This split in service between Vancouver and Ashcroft is due to CN and CPR utilizing directional running through the Thompson- and Fraser Canyon.

Footnotes

External links 
Via Rail Station Description

Via Rail stations in British Columbia